Oberea yunnanensis is a species of beetle in the family Cerambycidae. It was described by Stephan von Breuning in 1947. It is known from China.

References

Beetles described in 1947
yunnanensis